Jaime Pieras Jr. (May 19, 1924 – June 11, 2011) was a United States district judge of the United States District Court for the District of Puerto Rico.

Education and career

Born in San Juan, Puerto Rico, Pieras obtained a Bachelor of Arts degree from Catholic University of America in 1945 and his Juris Doctor from Georgetown University Law Center in 1948. He served as a Second Lieutenant in the United States Army immediately after World War II, from 1946 to 1947. He entered private practice in Hato Rey, Puerto Rico in 1949, spending 1954 in San Juan, before returning to Hato Rey. Piera's served as Puerto Rico's Republican National Committeeman while in private practice.

Federal judicial service

Pieras was nominated by President Ronald Reagan on June 2, 1982, to the United States District Court for the District of Puerto Rico, to a new seat authorized by 92 Stat. 1629. He was confirmed by the United States Senate on July 13, 1982, and received commission on July 15, 1982. He assumed senior status on August 1, 1993. His service terminated on June 11, 2011, due to his death in San Juan. He maintained a significant caseload until the illness that resulted in his death.

See also 
List of Hispanic/Latino American jurists

References

Sources
 

2011 deaths
1924 births
Catholic University of America alumni
Georgetown University Law Center alumni
Hispanic and Latino American judges
Judges of the United States District Court for the District of Puerto Rico
United States Army officers
United States district court judges appointed by Ronald Reagan
20th-century American judges
Republican Party (Puerto Rico) politicians
Puerto Rican Army personnel